The Bourbonnais Grey is a rare breed rabbit originally from France. It is a medium, exclusively slate-blue breed reaching around 4–5 kg (11 lb).

See also

List of rabbit breeds

References

Rabbit breeds
Rabbit breeds originating in France